Nickel silicides include several intermetallic compounds of nickel and silicon. Nickel silicides are important in microelectronics as they form at junctions of nickel and silicon. Additionally thin layers of nickel silicides may have application in imparting surface resistance to nickel alloys.

Compounds
Nickel silicides include Ni3Si, Ni31Si12, Ni2Si, Ni3Si2, NiSi and NiSi2.  Ni31Si12, Ni2Si, and NiSi have congruent melting points; the others form via a peritectic transformation.
The silicides can be made via fusion or solid state reaction between the elements, diffusion at a junction of the two elements, and other methods including ion beam mixing.

Properties
Nickel silicides are generally chemically and thermally stable.  They have low electrical resistivity; with NiSi 10.5–18 μΩ·cm, Ni2Si 24–30 μΩ·cm, NiSi2 34–50 μΩ·cm; nickel-rich silicides have higher resistivity rising to 90–150 μΩ·cm in Ni31Si12.

Uses

Microelectronics
Nickel silicides are important in microelectronic devices – specific silicides are good conductors, with NiSi having a conductivity approaching that of elemental nickel.
With silicon carbide as the semiconductor nickel reacts at elevated temperatures to form nickel silicides and carbon.

Other
Nickel silicides have potential as coatings for nickel-based superalloys and stainless steel, due to their corrosion, oxidation, and wear resistance.
NiSi has been investigated as a hydrogenation catalyst for unsaturated hydrocarbons. Nickel silicide nanoparticles supported on silica support have been suggested as an alternative catalyst to widely used pyrophoric Raney nickel.

See also
J. Marvin Herndon, who promoted a theory that the earth's core is nickel silicide
Titanium disilicide, also used in microelectronics
Salicide, self-aligned silicides

References

Further reading

Nickel compounds
Transition metal silicides
C
Fluorite crystal structure